This is a list of settlements in Elis, Greece.

 Achladini
 Aetorrachi
 Agios Andreas, Katakolo
 Agia Anna
 Agia Kyriaki
 Agia Mavra
 Agia Triada
 Agioi Apostoloi
 Agios Charalampos
 Agios Dimitrios
 Agios Georgios
 Agios Ilias, Amaliada
 Agios Ilias, Pyrgos
 Agios Ilias, Zacharo
 Agios Ioannis
 Agnanta
 Agrapidochori
 Agridi
 Alfeiousa
 Alifeira
 Alpochori
 Amaliada
 Ampelokampos
 Ampelonas
 Amygdalies
 Andravida
 Andritsaina
 Anemochori
 Anilio
 Anthonas
 Antroni
 Archaia Ilida
 Archaia Olympia
 Archaia Pisa
 Areti
 Arini
 Artemida
 Arvaniti
 Aspra Spitia
 Astras
 Avgeio
 Avgi
 Borsi
 Charia
 Chavari
 Cheimadio
 Chelidoni
 Chrysochori
 Dafni
 Dafniotissa
 Dafnoula
 Diasella
 Dimitra
 Doukas
 Douneika
 Dragogio
 Efyra
 Elaionas
 Epitalio
 Fanari
 Figaleia
 Flokas
 Foloi
 Fonaitika
 Frixa
 Gastouni
 Geraki
 Giannitsochori
 Goumero
 Graikas
 Granitsaiika
 Gryllos
 Irakleia
 Kafkonia
 Kakotari
 Kakovatos
 Kalidona
 Kallikomo
 Kallithea
 Kalyvakia
 Kalyvia Ilidos
 Kalyvia Myrtountion
 Kamena
 Kampos
 Kapeleto
 Karatoula
 Kardamas
 Kardiakafti
 Karya
 Kastro
 Katakolo
 Kato Panagia
 Kato Samiko
 Katsaros
 Kavasila
 Kentro
 Keramidia
 Kladeos
 Klindia
 Koliri
 Korakochori
 Koroivos
 Koryfi
 Koskinas
 Koufopoulo
 Koumanis
 Kourtesi
 Koutsochera
 Krestena
 Kryoneri, Figaleia
 Kryoneri, Olympia
 Kryonero
 Kryovrysi
 Kyllini
 Laganas
 Lalas
 Lampeia
 Lanthi
 Lasteika
 Latas
 Latzoi
 Lechaina
 Lefkochori
 Lepreo
 Leventochori
 Linaria
 Linistaina
 Livadaki
 Loukas
 Louvro
 Lygia
 Machos
 Mageiras
 Magoula
 Makistos
 Makrisia
 Manolada
 Matesi
 Mazaraki
 Melissa
 Milea
 Milies
 Minthi
 Mouria
 Mouzaki
 Myronia
 Myrsini
 Myrtia
 Nea Figaleia
 Nea Manolada
 Neapoli
 Nemouta
 Neochori, Zacharo
 Neochori Myrtountion
 Neraida
 Nisi
 Oinoi
 Oleni
 Oreini 
 Palaiochori
 Palaiovarvasaina
 Pefkes
 Pefki
 Pelopio
 Peristeri
 Perivolia
 Persaina
 Petralona
 Platanos
 Platiana
 Ploutochori
 Pournari
 Prasidaki
 Prasino
 Pyrgos
 Raches
 Rodia
 Rodina
 Roupaki
 Rovia
 Roviata
 Salmoni
 Samiko
 Savalia
 Schinoi
 Sekoulas
 Simiza
 Simopoulo
 Skafidia
 Skillountia
 Skliva
 Skourochori
 Smerna
 Smila
 Sopi
 Sosti
 Stafidokampos
 Stomio
 Strefi
 Strousi 
 Taxiarches
 Theisoa
 Tragano 
 Trypiti
 Tsipiana
 Varda
 Vartholomio
 Varvasaina
 Vasilaki
 Velanidi
 Vouliagmeni
 Vounargo
 Vresto
 Vrina
 Vrochitsa
 Vytinaiika
 Xenies
 Xirochori
 Xirokampos
 Xylokera
 Zacharo

By municipality

See also
List of towns and villages in Greece

 
Elis